Nij Altoenae (Bildts: Nij Altoenae) is a village in Waadhoeke municipality in the province of Friesland, the Netherlands. It had a population of around 300 in January 2017.

History
The village was first mentioned in 1958 as Nij-Altoenae. Nij (new) was added to distinguish between Altoenae. Altoenae was the former name of Sint Annaparochie which was named after the estate  near Delft, the neighbourhood where Dirk Oem van Wijngaarden, one of the first settlers, grew up. The village used to be call 't Wegje and had the status of a hamlet.

The Reformed Church was built in 1918. In 1928, a new church was built in a different location. The old church was sold, and is nowadays used as a shed. The new church was renovated in 2012.

In 2006, Nij Altoenae became a village. Until 2018, the village was part of het Bildt municipality.

Gallery

References

External links 
 
website about Altena

Waadhoeke
Populated places in Friesland